Miss Pettigrew Lives for a Day is a 2008 romantic comedy film directed by Bharat Nalluri, starring Frances McDormand and Amy Adams. The screenplay by David Magee and Simon Beaufoy is based on the 1938 novel of the same name by Winifred Watson.

Plot
Set in London just prior to World War II, the film follows a day in the life of Guinevere Pettigrew, a middle-aged, straitlaced vicar's daughter and governess who has just been fired from her fourth job. When Miss Holt, the head of the employment agency, tells her she is not able to find her another post, the destitute Miss Pettigrew leaves the office with an assignment intended for a colleague, unaware that the potential employer, flamboyant American singer-actress Delysia Lafosse, is seeking a social secretary rather than a governess.

Arriving at the luxurious apartment where Delysia is staying, Miss Pettigrew discovers that the younger woman is involved with three men: the devoted but penniless pianist Michael Pardue who has just been released from prison, the controlling but wealthy Nick Calderelli who owns the nightclub where she is performing, and the young theatre impresario Phil Goldman who is in a position to cast her in the lead role in a West End play. As she tries to help Delysia sort through her various affairs, Miss Pettigrew finds herself swept up into the world of high society. After being given a makeover by her new employer, she attends a fashion show where she meets and is strongly attracted to top lingerie designer Joe Blomfield who is currently involved in a tempestuous relationship with the show's host, Edythe Dubarry.

Over the course of twenty-four hours, Guinevere and Delysia become friends and help each other achieve their romantic destinies. After a series of complications, Delysia and Michael sail for New York aboard the Queen Mary, while Miss Pettigrew is found in Victoria Station by Joe who, now convinced that she is the woman for him, has been looking for her all night. They leave the station together, arm in arm.

Cast
 Frances McDormand as Guinevere Pettigrew
 Amy Adams as Delysia Lafosse
 Lee Pace as Michael Pardue
 Tom Payne as Phil Goldman
 Mark Strong as Nick Calderelli
 Shirley Henderson as Edythe Dubarry
 Ciarán Hinds as Joe Blomfield
 Christina Cole as Charlotte Warren
 Stephanie Cole as Miss Holt

Production

In Miss Pettigrew's Long Trip to Hollywood, a bonus feature on the film's DVD release, Keith Pickering, the son of the author of the original book, Winifred Watson, reveals his mother first sold the film rights to Universal Pictures in 1939. Within the next few years, the studio developed it as a musical to star Billie Burke in the title role but, just before filming was scheduled to begin, Japan bombed Pearl Harbor and the project was shelved.

In 1954, Universal renewed the rights, but the property remained undeveloped. When London producer Stephen Garrett discovered the book, he sought out American producer Nellie Bellflower, who had just produced the seven-time Oscar-nominated film Finding Neverland for Harvey Weinstein.

Garrett proposed a partnership to get it set up. Bellflower brought the adaptation to executives at Focus Features, but she learned the rights still belonged to Universal, which as the parent company of Focus, allowed them to proceed with the project. Filming locations included the Theatre Royal, Drury Lane in Covent Garden, Whitehall Court in Westminster, and Pimlico. Interiors were shot in the Ealing Studios.

Critical reception
, the film holds a 78% approval rating on the review aggregator Rotten Tomatoes, based on 150 reviews with an average rating of 6.66 out of 10. The website's critics consensus reads: "Miss Pettigrew is a breezy period comedy carried by the strong performances of Amy Adams and Frances McDormand." On Metacritic, the film has an average score of 63 out of 100, based on 27 reviews.

Stephen Holden of The New York Times called the film "an example of how a little nothing of a story can be inflated into a little something of a movie with perfect casting, dexterous tonal manipulation and an astute eye and ear for detail." He praised Amy Adams, saying the "screen magic" she displays "hasn't been this intense since the heyday of Jean Arthur", and he noted that Frances McDormand achieved her "metamorphosis from glum stoicism to demure radiance with impressive comic understatement."

In the San Francisco Chronicle, Ruthe Stein called the film "a swell adaptation" and added, "Frothy and exuberantly entertaining – in part because of the sexual innuendoes – it's the best romantic comedy so far this year ... Director Bharat Nalluri gives Miss Pettigrew Lives for a Day the patina of a film actually made in the 1930s."

Todd McCarthy of Variety said of the actors, "McDormand's performance slowly builds a solid integrity, and contrasts well with Adams' more flamboyant turn, which initially accentuates Delysia's constant role playing but eventually flowers into a gratifyingly full-fledged portrayal of a woman with a past she wishes to escape. Hinds puts real feeling into his work."

Box office
In its opening weekend in the United States and Canada, the film earned $2,490,942 on 535 screens, ranking No. 11 at the box office. It eventually grossed $12,313,694 in the US and Canada and $4,411,239 in other markets for a total worldwide box office of $16,724,933.

Music
The film's score was written and conducted by Paul Englishby, for which he won the ASCAP Award in 2009. Englishby also arranged and conducted three additional songs for the film:

"Brother, Can You Spare a Dime?"
One of the best known American Depression-era songs, it was written in 1930 by lyricist E. Y. "Yip" Harburg and composer Jay Gorney. The song was part of the 1932 musical Americana.
"T'ain't What You Do (It's the Way That You Do It)"
Written by jazz musicians Melvin "Sy" Oliver and James "Trummy" Young. It was first recorded in 1939 by Jimmie Lunceford, Harry James, and Ella Fitzgerald.
"If I Didn't Care"
Written by Jack Lawrence and first recorded by The Ink Spots, featuring Bill Kenny, in 1939.

Other songs
"Anything Goes"
Written by Cole Porter for his 1934 musical, Anything Goes.
A 1935 recording by Lew Stone and His Band, with vocals by The Radio Three (a British close-harmony trio similar to the Boswell Sisters), was featured in the film as Delysia and Miss Pettigrew headed to the fashion show.
"Dream"
Sometimes referred to as "Dream (When You're Feeling Blue)", "Dream" is a jazz and pop standard with words and music written by Johnny Mercer in 1944.
Even though the film takes place in 1939, The Pied Pipers' 1945 recording of "Dream" can be heard playing in the background, as if on a radio, as Delysia bathes.

References

External links 

  (archived)
 
 

2008 films
2008 romantic comedy films
British romantic comedy films
American romantic comedy films
Films set in 1939
Films based on British novels
Films directed by Bharat Nalluri
Focus Features films
Films with screenplays by Simon Beaufoy
Films set in London
Films shot in London
2000s female buddy films
Films about actors
Films about singers
2000s English-language films
2000s American films
2000s British films